Maria Natalia Londa (born 29 October 1990 in Denpasar) is an Indonesian track and field athlete who competes in the long jump and triple jump. She represented Indonesia at the World Championships in Athletics in 2007 and has appeared once at the Asian Games (2014).
She won the gold medal at the 2014 Asian Games in the long jump. She also won two gold medals at the 2013 Southeast Asian Games and two gold medals at the 2015 Southeast Asian Games.

She competed for Indonesia in the long jump at the 2016 Summer Olympics. She placed 23rd in the qualifying round and did not advance to the finals. She was the flagbearer for Indonesia during the Parade of Nations.

References

External links

Living people
1990 births
Female long jumpers
Indonesian long jumpers
Indonesian female athletes
People from Denpasar
Asian Games gold medalists for Indonesia
Asian Games medalists in athletics (track and field)
Athletes (track and field) at the 2014 Asian Games
Athletes (track and field) at the 2018 Asian Games
Athletes (track and field) at the 2016 Summer Olympics
Olympic athletes of Indonesia
Indonesian triple jumpers
Female triple jumpers
Medalists at the 2014 Asian Games
Sportspeople from Bali
Southeast Asian Games medalists in athletics
Southeast Asian Games gold medalists for Indonesia
Southeast Asian Games silver medalists for Indonesia
Southeast Asian Games bronze medalists for Indonesia
Competitors at the 2009 Southeast Asian Games
Competitors at the 2011 Southeast Asian Games
Competitors at the 2013 Southeast Asian Games
Competitors at the 2015 Southeast Asian Games
Competitors at the 2017 Southeast Asian Games
Competitors at the 2019 Southeast Asian Games
Islamic Solidarity Games competitors for Indonesia
Competitors at the 2021 Southeast Asian Games
21st-century Indonesian women